Lars Wistedt (born 1964 in Enköping) is a Swedish former military officer, security specialist and politician of the Sweden Democrats party who has been a member of the Riksdag since 2022 representing the  Uppsala County constituency.

Biography
Wistedt was born in 1964. He is a graduate of the Swedish Defence University after which he joined the Royal Swedish Army as an officer. He subsequently served as an intelligence officer with the Command and Control Regiment specialising in foreign operations. After leaving the military, he worked as a security consultant in various countries including Africa and the Middle East.

He first became active for the SD in Haga where he sat on the party's executive board and focused on matters related to tax and education. For the 2022 Swedish general election, Wistedt stood as a candidate for the party in the Uppsala County constituency and was elected to the Riksdag. He takes Seat 287 in parliament. In the Riksdag he serves on the committees for defense, education and the constitution.

See also 

 List of members of the Riksdag, 2022–2026

References 

1964 births
Living people
Swedish military personnel 
Swedish military officers
21st-century Swedish politicians
Members of the Riksdag from the Sweden Democrats
Members of the Riksdag 2022–2026